Dominick F. Mullaney (July 25, 1854 in New York City – August 1929) was an American politician from New York.

Life
He attended the public schools and City College, and then ran a shoe store at 281 Hudson Street in New York City. He entered politics, joining Tammany Hall.

Mullaney was a member of the New York State Assembly (New York Co., 5th D.) in 1883, 1884, 1889, 1890, 1891 and 1892.

He was again a member of the State Assembly (New York Co., 3rd D.) in 1898 and 1903.

He was a member of the New York State Senate (11th D.) in 1907 and 1908 and Clerk of the New York State Senate in 1923 and 1924.

References
 Official New York from Cleveland to Hughes by Charles Elliott Fitch (Hurd Publishing Co., New York and Buffalo, 1911, Vol. IV; pg. 315, 317, 325f, 328f, 339, 347 and 366)
 Fourth Annual Record of Assemblymen and Senators from the City of New York in the State Legislature published by the City Reform Club (1889; pg. 35ff)
 The New York Red Book by Edgar L. Murlin (1903; pg. 160)
 DOMINICK MULLANEY, EX-SENATOR, DIES in NYT on August 12, 1929 (subscription required)

1854 births
1929 deaths
Democratic Party New York (state) state senators
People from Manhattan
Democratic Party members of the New York State Assembly
City College of New York alumni